J. H. Johnson may refer to:
Janet Johnson (Egyptologist), born 1944
J. H. Johnson (politician), 19th century Mississippi legislator